Michael Anthony Magnante (born June 17, 1965) is a former professional baseball pitcher. He played 12 seasons in Major League Baseball as a left-handed relief pitcher for four teams.

On August 22, Magnante pitched an immaculate inning by striking out three batters on nine pitches in the ninth inning of a 6–3 win over the Cincinnati Reds. Magnante became the 20th National League pitcher and the 29th pitcher in major league history to accomplish the feat.

In 2002, the Oakland Athletics released Magnante days before vesting his pension because of the acquisition of Ricardo Rincón. This moment is depicted in the film Moneyball. As of 2020, he is a math teacher at Agoura High School.

References

External links

List of Agoura High School math teachers 

Major League Baseball pitchers
Kansas City Royals players
Houston Astros players
Anaheim Angels players
Oakland Athletics players
Baseball players from California
UCLA Bruins baseball players
1965 births
Living people
Anchorage Bucs players
Appleton Foxes players
Baseball City Royals players
Eugene Emeralds players
Las Vegas 51s players
Memphis Chicks players
New Orleans Zephyrs players
Omaha Royals players
Sacramento River Cats players
UCLA Henry Samueli School of Engineering and Applied Science alumni